Snake Bite Love is the fourteenth studio album by British rock band Motörhead. It was released on 10 March 1998 via Steamhammer, their third with the label.

Recording
Snake Bite Love would be the final album co-produced with Howard Benson. By all accounts, the recording was rushed, with drummer Mikkey Dee quoted in the 2011 Motörhead book Overkill: The Untold Story of Motörhead:

Lemmy was far kinder to the LP in his autobiography White Line Fever, feeling it "came out quite nicely" but admits it was recorded "all over the place." Lemmy recalls that the making of Snake Bite Love was quite normal for the band: 

He points particularly to "Desperate for You" and "Night Side" in this respect and explains how the title track started as a completely different song; Dee recorded the drums tracks against a totally different set of chords, then it went back to Sweden where Campbell stated he was sick of the song and didn't like it. Lemmy agreed and Campbell came up with a new riff and changed the whole thing. Lemmy admits that the album is a prime example of him writing the words at the last minute, and adds:

The track "Dead and Gone" is a rewrite of a song Lemmy wrote called "The Sky Is Burning", released on the Sam Gopal album Escalator.

Release
In the Motörhead documentary The Guts and the Glory, Lemmy admits that Snake Bite Love "had two turkeys on it" — referring to "Desperate For You" and "Better Off Dead", although he did acknowledge that fans liked the tracks. Campbell is jokingly credited in the album's liner notes as an unpronounceable glyph ("The Artist Frequently Seen at the Liquor Store"), mocking Prince.

Again, this album was not greeted with much fanfare. It continued the late 1990s ambivalence the general public had towards the band. Most of the tracks haven't been played in the live set, with few exceptions.

Reception
Reviewers have noted the album shows the less heavier side of Motörhead as there are "one or two too many slower tracks, but it's still heavy for the most part" and having a mixture of musical ideas, ranging from the true metal of "Dogs of War" and "Assassin" to rock and roll influenced songs like "Snake Bite Love" and "Don't Lie to Me".

Another view is the album is not as cutting and consistent as the previous effort but sees "Love for Sale" as a "grooving and flowing romp", "Joy of Labour" having "plenty of nasty slow riffs", and "Night Side" as a traditional fast track which will please "old school" fans.

AllMusic's Stephen Thomas Erlewine calls Snake Bite Love:

In 2011, Motörhead biographer Joel McIver deemed it "solid, reliable, and not hugely memorable."

Track listing

Personnel
Per the album's liner notes.
 Lemmy – lead vocals, bass
 Phil Campbell – lead guitar
 Mikkey Dee – drums

Production 
 Howard Benson – producer
 Chris Morrison – assistant engineer
 Greg D'Angelo – assistant engineer
 Kris Solem – mastering
 Motörhead – executive producers
 Joe Petagno – Snaggletooth, album cover
 Glen Laferman – photography

Charts

References

External links
 Motörhead official site listing for Snake Bite love
 Sample tracks at Rolling Stone

Motörhead albums
1998 albums
Albums with cover art by Joe Petagno
Albums produced by Howard Benson